Deralakatte is a major educational, healthcare, commercial & residential locality in the south-eastern part of Mangalore city in Dakshina Kannada district of Karnataka state. It is popularly known as the University Town with more number of student population, universities & the stretch from Thokottu junction to Konaje is also known as the Medical corridor road due to the presence of many premium educational institutions & healthcare facilities where Deralakatte lies in between. It is close to Mangalore University, Konaje, Mudipu Infosys, Soorya Infratech Park, Thokottu & Ullal. Ullal beach, Someshwar Beach, Pilikula Nisargadhama are some of the nearest tourist destinations. This locality houses the NITTE University, Yenepoya University,  Father Muller Charitable Institutions, Fathers Mullers Homeopathic Medical college  hospital and Kanachur Groups of institutions and Hospital. It is a largest University locality in Mangalore after Manipal university in terms of students from all over the country and other parts of the world.

Institutions of Higher Education
Nitte University
Yenepoya University
Father Muller Homeopathic Medical College
A B Shetty Memorial Institute of Dental Sciences
Kanachur Institute of Medical Sciences

Major Hospitals
K S Hegde Hospital
Yenepoya Medical and Dental Multispeciality Hospital
Father Muller Homeopathic Medical College Hospital
Kanachur Hospital & Research center

Barey's Mall, Deralakatte

Accessibility 
Deralakatte is well connected by various city buses from all parts of the city. Direct buses are available to statebank, Kankanady, Ullal, Surathkal, Mangalore Central railway station, Mangalore University, Infosys DC at Mudipu, Kasargod and other major destinations of Mangalore.

Distance from nearby railway stations:
Ullal railway station, Ullal, Mangalore - 6 km
Mangalore Central railway station, Hampankatta, Mangalore - 12 km
Mangalore Junction railway station, Padil, Mangalore - 12 km
Surathkal railway station, Surathkal, Mangalore - 27 km
Mulki railway station, Mulki, Mangalore - 41 km

Distance from Nearest Airport:
 Mangalore International Airport (India) - 23 km

See also 
 Sasihithlu Beach
 NITK Beach
 Panambur Beach
 Tannirbhavi Beach
 Ullal beach
 Someshwar Beach
 Pilikula Nisargadhama
 Kadri Park
 Tagore Park
 St. Aloysius Chapel
 Bejai Museum
 Aloyseum
 Kudla Kudru

Gallery

References

External links 
 https://www.facebook.com/myderalakatte/

Localities in Mangalore
Villages in Dakshina Kannada district